Corallomonas stylophorae is a Gram-negative, halophilic, facultatively anaerobic and non-motile bacterium from the genus of Corallomonas which has been isolated from the coral Stylophora pistillata in Kenting on Taiwan.

References

External links
Type strain of Corallomonas stylophorae at BacDive -  the Bacterial Diversity Metadatabase

Oceanospirillales
Bacteria described in 2013